Pseudechinolaena is a genus of tropical and subtropical plants in the grass family, all but one species endemic to Madagascar.

 Species
 Pseudechinolaena camusiana Bosser - Madagascar
 Pseudechinolaena madagascariensis (A.Camus) Bosser - Madagascar
 Pseudechinolaena moratii Bosser - Madagascar
 Pseudechinolaena perrieri A.Camus - Madagascar
 Pseudechinolaena polystachya (Humb., Bonpl. & Kunth) Stapf - tropical - southern Africa, Asia (China, Indian Subcontinent, Thailand, Vietnam, Malaysia, Indonesia), New Guinea, Latin America (from central Mexico to Uruguay)
 Pseudechinolaena tenuis Bosser - Madagascar

 Formerly included
see Echinochloa 
 Pseudechinolaena helodes  - Echinochloa helodes 
 Pseudechinolaena inflexa - Echinochloa inflexa  
 Pseudechinolaena spectabilis - Echinochloa polystachya

References

Poaceae genera
Grasses of Africa
Flora of Madagascar
Panicoideae